Árpád Bogsch (February 24, 1919 – September 19, 2004) was a Hungarian-American international civil servant. He was born in Budapest, Hungary, and became an American citizen in 1959. From 1973 to 1997, he was Director General of World Intellectual Property Organization (WIPO). He was also Secretary General of the International Union for the Protection of New Varieties of Plants (UPOV). He died in Geneva, Switzerland.

 
Bogsch was featured in the 1988 Swiss documentary film A Szellem Tulajdona (Property of the Intellect), directed by Zoltán Bonta.

There have been a number of tributes made in Bogsch's memory. The main building at WIPO headquarters in Geneva is named the "Árpád Bogsch building" in his honor. The Hungarian Intellectual Property Office, in the country of Bogsch's birth, features a bust of Bogsch by sculptor . The International Federation of Inventors' Associations in 2010 established the Árpád Bogsch Memory Medal, to be awarded to individuals who support invention and innovation in the same spirit as Bogsch.

Notable works
  A comprehensive annotation of the Universal Copyright Convention.

References

1919 births
2004 deaths
Hungarian emigrants to the United States
World Intellectual Property Organization people
American officials of the United Nations